"Diamond Light Boogie" is a song by American band the Cherry Poppin' Daddies on their 2000 album Soul Caddy. It was the first and only single released off Soul Caddy and the Daddies' fourth and final single to be released by Mojo Records.

Overview

Music and lyrics
Following the international success the Cherry Poppin' Daddies had experienced with their 1997 swing music compilation Zoot Suit Riot, the band had begun to feel dismayed over their media image as a "retro swing band" at the exclusion of the dominant ska and punk influences which made up much of their recorded material. As such, the band's follow-up studio album Soul Caddy would find the band moving away from swing music and into newer stylistic territory, drawing primarily from the rock and pop of the late 1960s and early 1970s.

"Diamond Light Boogie" was written as the album's leading single, a rock song that songwriter Steve Perry intended to help introduce a wider audience to a better perspective of the Daddies' music as well as attempt to bridge the gap between their swing-oriented fanbase and their non-swing music. The song is composed as a fusion of glam rock and jump swing, featuring the rhythmic backbeat and horn section common of swing music set against T. Rex-influenced guitar riffs. Said Perry of the track:

To help lend a vintage authenticity to the song's production, the Daddies enlisted supervision from legendary glam rock producer Tony Visconti, as well as featuring Mark Volman, formerly of The Turtles and the Mothers of Invention, to provide backing vocals.

Release and reception
Despite allowing the Daddies creative control over the writing and production of Soul Caddy, Mojo Records harbored ambivalent feelings over the album's largely rock-oriented musical direction and did little to promote either the album or its single, at one point releasing the latter without the Daddies' name on it, allegedly due to hesitancy over releasing a rock song from a band most widely known for swing music. Neither Soul Caddy nor "Diamond Light Boogie" met with any commercial success, but the single nevertheless received moderate critical attention. Allmusic, having given Soul Caddy a very positive review, described the song's glam styling and "sassy songwriting" as the epitome of the album's "musical excitement", while The Boston Globe, in a negative review, extensively criticized the album for being derivative of other artists, describing "Diamond Light Boogie" as being "ripped straight from The Soup Dragons' catalog".

Formats and track listing

Personnel
Steve Perry - lead vocals, guitar
Dan Schmid - bass guitar
Jason Moss - guitar
Dana Heitman - trumpet
Sean Flannery - tenor saxophone, bass clarinet
Ian Early - alto saxophone, bass clarinet
Tim Donahue - drums
Dustin Lanker - keyboards

Additional musicians
Johnny Goetchius - backing vocals
Mark Volman - backing vocals

Production
Produced by Steve Perry and Jack Joseph Puig
Additional production by Tony Visconti and Anders Hanssen
Mixed by Jack Joseph Puig

References

2000 singles
Cherry Poppin' Daddies songs
Glam rock songs
2000 songs
Song recordings produced by Tony Visconti